Jason Douglas Miller (born July 20, 1982) is a former left-handed Major League Baseball pitcher. He played nine seasons in the Minnesota Twins organization until becoming a free agent at the end of the 2008 season. He made his major league debut with the Twins in 2007.

In January 2009, he signed a minor league contract with the Detroit Tigers, but was released in April.

References

External links

1982 births
Living people
Major League Baseball pitchers
Baseball players from Florida
Minnesota Twins players
Fort Myers Miracle players
Rochester Red Wings players
Sarasota High School alumni
Sportspeople from Sarasota, Florida
Elizabethton Twins players
Gulf Coast Twins players
New Britain Rock Cats players
Quad Cities River Bandits players